Artyom Maksimovich Okulov (born 5 May 1994) is a Russian weightlifter, and two time World Champion competing in the 85 kg category until 2018 and 89 kg starting in 2018 after the International Weightlifting Federation reorganized the categories.

Career
At the 2010 Summer Youth Olympics he won the gold medal in the 77 kg category with a total of 327 kg.

He was the bronze medalist in the 85 kg category at both the 2013 and 2014 World Championships.

In 2015 he became world champion in the 85 kg category, and Okulov was named Honored Master of Sports of Russia, the highest national sports title.

In 2018, the International Weightlifting Federation restructured the weight categories, and Okulov competed in, and won the 89 kg category becoming World Champion again.

Major results

References

External links

Russian male weightlifters
Living people
World Weightlifting Championships medalists
Weightlifters at the 2010 Summer Youth Olympics
1994 births
Universiade medalists in weightlifting
Universiade silver medalists for Russia
Youth Olympic gold medalists for Russia
European Weightlifting Championships medalists
Medalists at the 2013 Summer Universiade